Intergroup relations refers to interactions between individuals in different social groups, and to interactions taking place between the groups themselves collectively. It has long been a subject of research in social psychology, political psychology, and organizational behavior.

In 1966, Muzafer Sherif proposed a now-widely recognized definition of intergroup relations:

Research on intergroup relations involves the study of many psychological phenomena related to intergroup processes including social identity, prejudice, group dynamics, and conformity among many others. Research in this area has been shaped by many notable figures and continues to provide empirical insights into modern social issues such as social inequality and discrimination.

History 
While philosophers and thinkers have written about topics related to intergroup relations dating back to Aristotle's Politics, the psychological study of group attitudes and behavior began in the late 19th century. One of the earliest scientific publications on group processes is The Crowd: A Study of the Popular Mind, written in 1895 by French doctor and scientist Gustave Le Bon. Le Bon proposed that a group of individuals is different from the sum of its parts (often paraphrased as "a group is more than the sum of its parts"). This fundamental idea of crowd psychology states that when individuals form a group, this group behaves differently than each individual would normally act. Le Bon theorized that when individuals formed a group or crowd, there would emerge a new psychological construct which would be shaped by the group's "racial [collective] unconscious." Le Bon put forth three phenomena that explained crowd behavior: submergence (or anonymity), when individuals lose their sense of self and responsibility by joining a crowd, contagion, the tendency for individuals in a crowd to follow the beliefs and behaviors of the crowd, and suggestion, which refers to how the beliefs and behaviors of the crowd are shaped by a shared racial unconscious. Subsequent generations of intergroup relations and social influence researchers built from these foundational ideas and explored them through empirical studies.

The empirical study of intergroup relations, as well as the broader field of social psychology, grew tremendously in the years following World War II. The events of World War II, including the rise of Adolf Hitler and Fascism, the Holocaust, and the widespread use of propaganda, led many social scientists to study intergroup conflict, obedience, conformity, dehumanization, and other related phenomena. Social scientists were interested in understanding the behavior of the German population under Nazi rule, specifically how their attitudes were influenced by propaganda and how so many could obey orders to carry out or support the mass murder of Jews and other minority groups as part of the Holocaust. Several prominent social psychologists were directly affected by the Nazi's actions because of their Jewish faith, including Kurt Lewin, Fritz Heider, and Solomon Asch. Muzafer Sherif was briefly detained by the Turkish government in 1944 for his pro-communist and anti-fascist beliefs. These scientists would draw from these experiences and go on to make major theoretical contributions to intergroup relations research as well as the broader field of psychology.

The cognitive revolution in psychology in the 1950s and 60s led researchers to study how cognitive biases and heuristics influence beliefs and behavior. The resulting focus on cognitive processes and meaning-making represented a significant shift away from the mainstream behaviorist philosophy that shaped much of psychology research in the first half of the 20th century. During and after the cognitive revolution, intergroup relations researchers began to study cognitive biases, heuristics, and stereotypes and their influences on beliefs and behavior. Solomon Asch's studies on conformity in the 1950s were among the first experiments to explore how a cognitive process (the need to conform to the behavior of the group) could override individual preferences to directly influence behavior. Leon Festinger also focused on cognitive processes in developing cognitive dissonance theory, which Elliot Aronson and other researchers would later build upon to describe how individuals feel liking for a group they were initiated into but whose views they may not agree with.

The Civil Rights Movement of the 1950s and 60s led social scientists to study prejudice, discrimination, and collective action in the context of race in America. In 1952, the NAACP put out a call for social science research to further study these issues in light of the Brown v. Board of Education lawsuit. Gordon Allport's 1954 book The Nature of Prejudice provided the first theoretical framework for understanding and counteracting prejudice, and cemented prejudice as a central focus of social psychology. In his book, Allport proposed the contact hypothesis which states that interpersonal contact, under the correct conditions, can be an effective means of reducing prejudice, discrimination, and reliance on stereotypes. Subsequent generations of scientists built on and applied Allport's contact hypothesis to other domains of prejudice including sexism, homophobia, and ableism.

In 1967, Martin Luther King spoke at the annual meeting of the American Psychological Association urging social scientists to advance causes of social justice in their research. In his speech, King called on scientists to study many topics related to the civil rights movement, including the barriers to upward social mobility for African Americans, political engagement and action in the African American community, and the processes of psychological and ideological change among African Americans and Whites.

Intergroup relations research in the final decades of the 20th century refined earlier theories and applied insights from the field in real-world settings. For example, Lee Ross applied his research on correspondence biases and attributional errors in his work on the conflict resolution process in Northern Ireland during The Troubles.

Other researchers have focused on positive elements of intergroup behavior, including helping, cooperation, and altruism between groups. One example of this is a recent field study by Betsy Paluck and colleagues, where they used a radio drama infused with positive social norms to increase reconciliation behaviors and attitudes among an entire village in Rwanda.

Researchers have also applied intergroup theories to workplace settings; one such example is Richard Hackman's work on creating and managing groups or teams in the workplace. Hackman proposed that teams and work groups are successful when specific conditions are met. Specifically, when members of the team and their clients are satisfied, team members are able to grow professionally, and team members find their work meaningful.

The advancement of technology has also shaped the study of intergroup relations, first with the adoption of computer software and later with the utilization of neuro-imaging techniques such as fMRI.  One example of psychologists leveraging new technology to advance intergroup relations research is the implicit-association test (IAT), developed by Anthony Greenwald and colleagues in 1998 as a means to measure the strength of implicit (automatic) association of between different mental representations of objects. The IAT is commonly used to measure the strength of implicit bias for a variety of constructs including gender-workplace stereotypes and stereotypes about race.

Foundational theories

Contact hypothesis 
Gordon Allport developed this hypothesis, which states that contact with members of another social group in the appropriate circumstances can lead to a reduction of prejudice between majority and minority group members. There are three psychological processes underlying the contact hypothesis: learning about the outgroup through direct contact, fear and anxiety reduction when interacting with the outgroup, and increased ability to perspective take and empathize with the outgroup which results in reduced negative evaluation. These processes take place optimally when four conditions are met. Groups must:

 Have relatively equal status
 Have shared goals
 Be able to cooperate with each other
 Recognize an authority or law that supports interactions between the two groups.

Some researchers have critiqued the contact hypothesis, specifically its generalizability and the fact that intergroup contact can result in an increase rather than decrease in prejudice.

Realistic conflict theory 
Realistic Conflict Theory (RCT), also known as Realistic Group Conflict Theory (RGCT), is a model of intergroup conflict that describes how conflict and prejudice between groups stems from conflicting goals and competition for limited resources. Groups may compete for concrete resources such as money and land or abstract resources such as political power and social status which leads to hostility-perpetuating zero-sum beliefs. The RCT was originally proposed by Donald T. Campbell and was later elaborated on in classic experiments by Muzafer Sherif and Carolyn Wood Sherif. The Sherifs' Robbers Cave experiment provided evidence for the RCT by arbitrarily assigning boys at a summer camp with similar backgrounds to different groups. The boys in these groups then competed with each other and elicited hostile outgroup beliefs until a superordinate, cooperative goal was imposed that required the groups to work together resulted in decreased feelings of hostility. Sherif maintained that group behavior cannot result from an analysis of individual behavior and that intergroup conflict, particularly those driven by the competition for scarce resources, creates ethnocentrism.

The Robbers Cave Experiment was conducted in 1954 and was designed to test theories of intergroup conflict. The experiment was designed so that there were two groups of campers, the Eagles and the Rattlers. As the independent variable, experimenters devoided the campers of certain rewards and resources. It was found that when there is a limited amount of resources, there will inevitably be conflict between the groups to fight for those resources. Each group in this experiment also did not see the other group as more or even equally favorable as their own. In the end, this competition eventually led to violence and was broken up only through working together (contact theory). This showed that even if you begin unaffiliated with a group, as soon as you find a group that you associate yourself with (become part of in-group), you will take on the qualities and characteristics of the individuals in that group; whatever that group norm is, you inherent as your own. 

Source: University of Oklahoma. Institute of Group Relations, and Muzafer Sherif. Intergroup conflict and cooperation: The Robbers Cave experiment. Vol. 10. Norman, OK: University Book Exchange, 1961.

Social identity approach 
In the 1970s and 80s, Henri Tajfel and John Turner proposed two connected theories of social identity, self-categorization theory and social identity theory, that together form a method for understanding the psychological processes underlying how individuals make sense of their identities and group membership.

Self-categorization theory explains the contexts in which an individual perceives a collection of people as a group and the psychological processes that result from an individual perceiving people in terms of a group.

Social identity theory describes how individual identity is shaped by membership in a social group. It also predicts differences in intergroup behavior based on perceived status differences between social groups, the legitimacy and stability of those perceived status differences, and ability to move between social groups.

The social identity approach has had a wide-ranging impact on social psychology, influencing theory on topics such as social influence, self-stereotyping, and personality.

Current directions 
Early research on intergroup relations focused on understanding the processes behind group interactions and dynamics, constructing theories to explain these processes and related psychological phenomena. Presently, intergroup relations is characterized by researchers applying and refining these theories in the context of modern social issues such as addressing social inequality and reducing discrimination based on gender identity, sexual orientation, race/ethnicity, and religion.

Prejudice reduction 
Theories from intergroup relations research have informed many approaches to prejudice reduction. Researchers have focused on developing theoretical frameworks for understanding how to effectively reduce intergroup conflict and prejudice. For example, a recent intervention developed by Patricia Devine and colleagues focuses on training individuals to overcome cognitive biases and reduce implicit bias. The intervention resulted in reduced implicit bias up to two months after the intervention was administered. Other prejudice reduction research has investigated intergroup interaction techniques including cooperative learning (such as Elliot Aronson's "Jigsaw Classroom") and making group identity less salient or a superordinate identity more salient in addition to individual techniques such as encouraging perspective-taking with a member of a stigmatized group and building empathy with stigmatized groups.

Meta-analyses of implicit bias reduction studies have shown that many produce limited effects that do not persist outside of a laboratory setting. Some researchers have called for more field research and studies that employ longitudinal designs to test the external validity and durability of existing prejudice reduction techniques, especially workplace diversity programs that may not be informed by empirical research.

Addressing social inequalities 
Social scientists have examined phenomena related to social inequality such as poverty, disenfranchisement, and discrimination since the early days of social psychology. However, researchers have only recently begun developing theories on the psychological consequences and impacts of social inequality. Current research on social inequality has explored the psychological effects of racially disparate policing practices on minorities, whites' tendency to underestimate the pain of blacks due to false beliefs in biological differences, how increasing belonging among students from stigmatized backgrounds can boost their GPAs and retention rates, and how social class influences prosocial behavior.

A majority of research on social inequality has principally focused on single categories such as race and gender. Increasingly, more researchers are exploring the effects of how the intersection of identities affect individual and group psychological processes. For example, Judith Harackiewicz and her colleagues examined race and social class as related constructs in a utility-value intervention designed to close the racial achievement gap of underrepresented minority students in introductory STEM college courses.

Other areas of current intergroup relations research include:

 Understanding white backlash to racial diversity

 Effectively managing teams and group identities in the workplace
 Understanding the psychological processes behind political and ideological polarization
 Further studying cross-cultural communication

Notable figures (1900–1979)

Kurt Lewin  
Kurt Lewin is considered to be one of the founding fathers of social psychology and made major contributions to psychological research. Lewin founded the Research Center for Group Dynamics at MIT in 1945:

"Lewin was interested in the scientific study of the processes that influence individuals in group situations, and the center initially focused on group productivity; communication; social perception; intergroup relations; group membership; leadership and improving the functioning of groups."

Lewin coined the term group dynamics to describe how individuals and groups behave differently depending on their environmental context. In terms of intergroup relations, he applied his formula of B = ƒ(P, E) - behavior is a function of the person and their environment - to group behavior. The theory behind this formula, which emphasizes that context shapes behavior in conjunction with an individual's motivations and beliefs, is a cornerstone of social psychological research. Lewin conducted numerous studies that pioneered the field of organizational psychology, including the Harwood Research studies which showed that group decision-making, leadership training, and self-management techniques could improve employee productivity.

Gordon Allport 

The American social psychologist Gordon Allport is considered to be one of the pioneers of the psychological study of intergroup relations. Especially influential is Allport's 1954 book The Nature of Prejudice, which proposed the contact hypothesis and has provided a foundation for research on prejudice and discrimination since the mid-1950s. Allport's contributions to the field are still being elaborated upon by psychologists, with one example being the common ingroup identity model developed by Jack Dovidio and Samuel Gaertner in the 1990s. In honor of Allport's contributions to psychology, the Society for the Psychological Study of Social Issues named their annual intergroup relations prize after him.

Beyond his theoretical contributions to the field, Allport mentored many students who would go on to make important contributions of their own to intergroup relations research. These students include Anthony Greenwald, Stanley Milgram, and Thomas Pettigrew.

Muzafer Sherif and Carolyn Wood Sherif 
Muzafer Sherif and Carolyn Wood Sherif performed multiple notable experiments on the subject in the mid-20th century including the Robbers Cave experiments; these experiments formed the basis for realistic conflict theory. These studies have had a lasting impact on the field, providing a theoretical explanation for the origin of intergroup prejudice while also exploring techniques to reduce negative attitudes between groups. The Sherifs proposed that group behavior cannot result from an analysis of individual behavior and that intergroup conflict, particularly those driven by the competition for scarce resources, creates ethnocentrism. Muzafer Sherif's research on the psychology of group conflict was informed by his experiences observing and studying discrimination and social pressures in the United States and in Turkey.

Carolyn Wood Sherif, along with Muzafer Sherif and Carl Hovland, developed social judgment theory, a model for self-persuasion that explains how individuals perceive and evaluate new ideas by comparing them with current attitudes. The theory sought to outline how individuals make sense of persuasive messages and how this can in turn influence individual and group beliefs.

Solomon Asch 

Solomon Asch's work on conformity in the 1950s also helped shape the study of intergroup relations by exploring how the social pressures of group membership influence individuals to adhere their behavior, attitudes, and beliefs to group norms. The results of these studies showed that individuals could yield to group pressure, with subsequent studies investigating the conditions under which individuals are more or less likely to conform to the behavior of the group. Asch's research, along with Stanley Milgram's shock experiments, shed light on the psychological processes underlying obedience, conformity, and authority.

Henri Tajfel and John Turner 

British psychologists Henri Tajfel and John Turner developed social identity theory and later self-categorization theory, pioneering the social identity approach in psychology in the 1970s and 80s. Tajfel and Turner were among the first psychologists to study the importance of social group membership and explore how the salience of an individual's group membership determined behavior and beliefs in the group context. Tajfel invented the minimal groups paradigm, an experimental method of arbitrarily assigning to individuals to groups (e.g., by flipping a coin) which showed that even when individuals were divided into arbitrary, meaningless groups, they tended to show favoritism for their own group.

Notable figures (1980–present)

Lee Ross 
Lee Ross has conducted research on several psychological phenomena closely related to intergroup relations including the fundamental attribution error, belief perseverance, and most recently naive realism - the idea that individuals believe they see the world objectively and that those who disagree with them must be irrational or biased. In 1984, Ross co-founded the Stanford Center on International Conflict and Negotiation (SCICN), an interdisciplinary research center focused on applying findings from psychology, law, and sociology to help resolve international socio-political conflicts. Ross and his colleagues at SCICN studied many of these concepts as they apply to conflict resolution and worked on negotiation and resolution efforts in Northern Ireland during The Troubles and in the middle east in the wake of the Gulf War.

Susan Fiske 
Susan Fiske, along with her colleagues Amy Cuddy, Peter Glick, and Jun Xu, developed the stereotype content model which states that stereotypes and intergroup impressions are formed along two dimensions: warmth and competence. The stereotype content model builds from evolutionary psychology theory, stating that individuals tend to first assess whether people are a threat (warmth) and then assess how people will act based on the initial assessment (competence). It follows that social groups that compete for real or perceived resources such as money or political power are considered low on warmth while social groups that are high-status (e.g. in terms of finance or education) are rated high on competence. Fiske also co-developed the widely used Ambivalent Sexism Inventory, a measure of hostile sexism and benevolent sexism.

Claude Steele 
Claude Steele and his colleagues Steve Spencer and Joshua Aronson are known for studying stereotype threat - the situational pressure one feels when they are at risk of confirming a negative stereotype about their group. Three factors underlie the mechanism of stereotype threat: stress arousal, performance monitoring, and cognitive efforts to reduce negative thoughts and feelings. There is evidence that stereotype threat plays a role in lower academic and professional performance among individuals in negatively stereotyped groups, although other studies have called this into question. Steele and his collaborators have studied several forms of interventions to mitigate stereotype threat, including self-affirmation methods and providing psychologically "wise" critical feedback.

Anthony Greenwald 
Anthony Greenwald and colleagues Debbie McGhee and Jordan Schwartz designed the implicit-association test or IAT. The IAT is used to test the strength of an individual's implicit (automatic) associations between mental representations and is commonly used in intergroup research to test implicit bias. Recently, the validity of the IAT as a measure of implicit bias has been called into question. Greenwald, who was a student of Gordon Allport, has also investigated in-group favoritism as it relates to discrimination and implicit social bias across a variety of topics including effects on medical school admissions and stereotype formation among young children.

Jim Sidanius 
Jim Sidanius and Felicia Pratto developed social dominance theory, which states that most social groups are organized into hierarchies within developed societies. According to the theory, these hierarchies are based on age, with older individuals having more power, sex, with men having more power than women, and arbitrary-set hierarchies which are culturally defined and can include race/ethnicity, religion, and nationality. The theory also predicts patterns of group conflict based on a high-power hegemonic groups discriminating and oppressing low-power groups, with one mechanism of oppression involving myths that legitimize the hegemonic group's status. Sidanius developed the social dominance orientation scale to measure the desire for one's in-group to dominate and be superior to out-groups.

Jennifer Richeson 
Jennifer Richeson studies racial identity, social inequality, and interracial relations with a focus on understanding the psychological processes behind reactions to diversity. Richeson's research has examined whites' and minorities' reactions to the likely future "majority-minority" demographic in the United States, specifically how whites feel threatened to this increase in diversity and how this threat influences political attitudes and perceptions of immigrants. In work focusing on social inequality, Richeson and her colleagues Michael Kraus and Julian Rucker found that Americans incorrectly estimate the extent to which economic equality has been achieved with both whites and blacks with high and low incomes overestimating race-based economic equality.

In 2006, Richeson was awarded a MacArthur Foundation Fellowship for using mixed methods, including fMRI, to show that interracial contact reduces performance on inhibitory tasks because individuals engage in self-control behaviors to handle fears of appearing prejudiced (whites) or fears of being a target of prejudice (blacks).

Jennifer Eberhardt 
Jennifer Eberhardt conducts research that investigates the psychological associations between race/ethnicity and crime. She has shown that police officers tend to identify black faces as criminals more often than white faces, that criminal defendants with more stereotypically black features were more likely to receive harsher sentences including the death penalty, and that when people think of black juvenile offenders they tend to perceive all juvenile offenders as more adult, resulting in higher levels of punishment.

Eberhardt received a MacArthur Foundation Fellowship in 2014 for her research on the effects of racial bias and their societal consequences. She is a co-founder of Social Psychological Answers to Real-world Questions (SPARQ), a translational research organization that applies psychological findings to address social issues.

Academic journals

See also  
In-group and out-group
Intergroup bias
Intergroup dialogue
Social norms
Social projection
Psychology of social class

References

External links 
 Research Center for Group Dynamics (RCGD) at the University of Michigan (formerly at MIT)
 Stanford Center on International Conflict and Negotiation (SCICN)
 Social Psychological Answers to Real-World Questions (SPARQ)
 The Gordon Allport Intergroup Relations Prize - The Society for the Psychological Study of Social Issues



Organizational theory
Psychological concepts